2022 Italian Athletics Indoor Championships is the 54th edition of the Italian Athletics Indoor Championships held in Ancona.

Champions

Note:
Full results.

See also
 2022 Italian Athletics Championships

References

External links
 All results at FIDAL web site

Italian Athletics Championships
Athletics
Italian Athletics Indoor Championships
Italian Athletics Indoor Championships